Fort Fork a North West Company (NWC) trading post on the Peace River, established in 1792. From 1 November 1792 to 9 May 1793, Alexander Mackenzie wintered there prior to his expedition to the Pacific Ocean. The fort was used until the NWC merged with the XY Company in 1805, after which it was replaced by Fort Dunvegan, further upstream.

The fort was located southwest of the present-day town of Peace River, Alberta. No known physical remains of the fort have survived, but there is an archaeological site there marked by a semi-circular depression and a cairn.  The site was declared a National Historic Site of Canada in 1928.

References

North West Company forts
Forts or trading posts on the National Historic Sites of Canada register
1792 establishments in the British Empire
Municipal District of Smoky River No. 130
National Historic Sites in Alberta
1805 disestablishments
Fur trade National Historic Sites of Canada